The Ortigas Interchange, also known as the EDSA–Ortigas Interchange or the Ortigas Flyover, is a three-level partial stack interchange at the boundary between Mandaluyong and Quezon City in Metro Manila, the Philippines which serves as the junction between Epifanio de los Santos Avenue (EDSA) and Ortigas Avenue.  Originally a regular four-way intersection, the current interchange was built in 1991 as the flagship infrastructure project of President Corazon Aquino.

History

The primary impetus for the construction of the Ortigas Interchange was the need to improve travel times along Epifanio de los Santos Avenue (EDSA), with the road already suffering from severe traffic congestion.  On January 11, 1991, President Corazon Aquino approved the construction of the interchange along with two other major road projects.  However, the urgent need to resolve traffic problems on EDSA allowed for the project to expedited.

Construction of the ₱400 million interchange began on April 1, 1991, with work being contracted to F. F. Cruz and Co., one of the Philippines' largest construction companies, under the supervision of the Department of Public Works and Highways.  The interchange's northbound lanes were opened to traffic on December 23, 1991.

Between 1993 and 1998, maintenance of the Ortigas Interchange was handled by the Manila Jaycees, under an agreement that the group signed with the Metropolitan Manila Authority.

During the 2001 EDSA Revolution, crowds gathered around the Ortigas Interchange and the EDSA Shrine, demanding the resignation of President Joseph Estrada.

Criticism
Though intended to alleviate traffic congestion on the Ortigas portion of EDSA, the Ortigas Interchange has been criticized for actually making traffic congestion worse.  The interchange's at-grade service roads have been criticized for being too narrow, with pavement quality on the southbound service road being so bad that buses, which use the service road, go very slowly, slowing traffic down further.

See also
Epifanio de los Santos Avenue
Ortigas Avenue

References

Road interchanges in the Philippines